Michael Edward Lonsdale-Crouch (24 May 1931 – 21 September 2020), commonly known as Michael Lonsdale and sometimes as Michel Lonsdale, was a French actor and author who appeared in over 180 films and television shows. He is best known in the English-speaking world for his roles as the villain Hugo Drax in the 1979 James Bond film Moonraker, the detective Claude Lebel in The Day of the Jackal, The Abbot in The Name of the Rose and Dupont d'Ivry in The Remains of the Day.

Early life and education 
Lonsdale was born in Paris, the son of British Army officer Edward Lonsdale-Crouch and his half-French, half-Irish wife Simone Béraud. He was brought up initially on the island of Guernsey, then in London from 1935, and later, during the Second World War, in Casablanca, Morocco.

Career
He returned to Paris to study painting in 1947, but was drawn into the world of acting instead, first appearing on stage at the age of 24. Lonsdale was bilingual, and appeared in both English-language and French-language productions. He appeared in a starring role with Roger Moore in the 1979 James Bond film Moonraker. and with Sean Connery, in the 1984 film The Name of the Rose. He would later appear in Munich, a film that also starred another Bond, Daniel Craig.

In February 2011, he won a César Award for Best Supporting Actor for his work in Of Gods and Men.

Lonsdale was also the author of ten books.

Personal life and death
In his 2016 memoir Le Dictionnaire de Ma Vie, Lonsdale revealed he had fallen for Delphine Seyrig, having met her as a student in Tania Balachova's acting classes at the Théâtre du Vieux-Colombier in 1947. He wrote that "it was her or nothing", which was why he never married.

Lonsdale died in Paris on 21 September 2020, aged 89.

Filmography

Film

Television

Video games

References

External links

1931 births
2020 deaths
French male stage actors
French male film actors
French male television actors
French people of English descent
French people of Irish descent
Male actors from Paris
French Roman Catholics
Best Actor Lumières Award winners
20th-century French male actors
21st-century French male actors
Best Supporting Actor César Award winners